Chryseobacterium elymi is an bacterial species found in the rhizospheres of coastal sand dune plants. It is Gram-negative, non-spore-forming and non-motile. Its type strain is RHA3-1T (=KCTC 22547T =NBRC 105251T).

References

Further reading
Ambardar, Sheetal, and Jyoti Vakhlu. "Plant growth promoting bacteria from Crocus sativus rhizosphere." World Journal of Microbiology and Biotechnology29.12 (2013): 2271–2279.
Pridgeon, J. W., P. H. Klesius, and J. C. Garcia. "Identification and virulence of Chryseobacterium indologenes isolated from diseased yellow perch (Perca flavescens)." Journal of Applied Microbiology 114.3 (2013): 636–643.
Kämpfer, Peter, John A. McInroy, and Stefanie P. Glaeser. "Chryseobacterium zeae sp. nov., Chryseobacterium arachidis sp. nov., and Chryseobacterium geocarposphaerae sp. nov. isolated from the rhizosphere environment." Antonie van Leeuwenhoek 105.3 (2014): 491–500.

External links

LPSN
Type strain of Chryseobacterium elymi at BacDive -  the Bacterial Diversity Metadatabase

elymi